Laketown is a town in Rich County, Utah, United States. The population was 248 at the 2010 census. The town is named for nearby Bear Lake.

Geography
According to the United States Census Bureau, the town has a total area of 1.0 square mile (2.6 km2), all land.

Climate
This climatic region is typified by large seasonal temperature differences, with warm to hot summers and cold (sometimes severely cold) winters.  According to the Köppen Climate Classification system, Laketown has a humid continental climate, abbreviated "Dfb" on climate maps.

Demographics

As of the census of 2000, there were 188 people, 60 households, and 51 families residing in the town. The population density was 186.3 people per square mile (71.9/km2). There were 89 housing units at an average density of 88.2 per square mile (34.0/km2). The racial makeup of the town was 96.28% White, 3.19% Asian, and 0.53% from two or more races.

There were 60 households, out of which 48.3% had children under the age of 18 living with them, 80.0% were married couples living together, 1.7% had a female householder with no husband present, and 15.0% were non-families. 15.0% of all households were made up of individuals, and 8.3% had someone living alone who was 65 years of age or older. The average household size was 3.13 and the average family size was 3.51.

In the town, the population was spread out, with 32.4% under the age of 18, 8.5% from 18 to 24, 18.6% from 25 to 44, 27.7% from 45 to 64, and 12.8% who were 65 years of age or older. The median age was 40 years. For every 100 females, there were 97.9 males. For every 100 females age 18 and over, there were 111.7 males.

The median income for a household in the town was $60,893, and the median income for a family was $65,000. Males had a median income of $40,972 versus $31,875 for females. The per capita income for the town was $23,519. About 3.6% of families and 7.0% of the population were below the poverty line, including 13.3% of those under the age of eighteen and 10.5% of those 65 or over.

Notable person
 John Brown, fantasy author

References

External links
 Official website

Towns in Rich County, Utah
Towns in Utah
Populated places established in 1864